Katrina M. Wyman is a Canadian legal scholar and the Sarah Herring Sorin Professor of Law at New York University School of Law.

Early life and education 
Wyman was born and raised in Canada. She earned a Bachelor of Arts, Master of Arts, and Master of Laws from the University of Toronto and another Master of Laws from Yale Law School.

Career 
Wyman's scholarship concerns the law of property and environmental law, sometimes integrating the two approaches. Among Wyman's works is a study of the property implications of taxi medallions in New York City.

Selected publications

References

External links 
 Profile at New York University School of Law

New York University School of Law faculty
American environmental lawyers
American legal scholars
Women legal scholars
Year of birth missing (living people)
Living people

Canadian legal scholars
University of Toronto alumni
University of Toronto Faculty of Law alumni
Yale Law School alumni